Bruce Givens (born February 26, 1956) is an American politician who has served in the Kansas Senate from the 14th district from 2017 to 2021.

References

External links
 Bruce Givens at VoteSmart

1956 births
Living people
Republican Party Kansas state senators
21st-century American politicians
People from Coffey County, Kansas
Emporia State University alumni